David Shute (born February 10, 1971) is an American former professional ice hockey and roller hockey left winger.

Shute was drafted 163rd overall by the Pittsburgh Penguins in the 1989 NHL Entry Draft but never played in the National Hockey League. He played in the International Hockey League for the Muskegon Lumberjacks and the East Coast Hockey League for the Knoxville Cherokees, Erie Panthers, Hampton Roads Admirals and Raleigh Icecaps.

Shute also played five seasons in Roller Hockey International, playing for the Minnesota Arctic Blast, Minnesota Blue Ox and St. Louis Vipers.

Career statistics

References

External links

1971 births
Living people
Amarillo Rattlers players
American men's ice hockey left wingers
Chatham Wheels players
Corpus Christi Icerays players
El Paso Buzzards players
Erie Panthers players
Hampton Roads Admirals players
Ice hockey players from Minnesota
ERC Ingolstadt players
Knoxville Cherokees players
Lake Charles Ice Pirates players
Medicine Hat Tigers players
Minnesota Arctic Blast players
Minnesota Blue Ox players
Muskegon Lumberjacks players
Odessa Jackalopes players
Oklahoma City Blazers (1992–2009) players
People from Richfield, Minnesota
Pittsburgh Penguins draft picks
Raleigh Icecaps players
San Angelo Outlaws players
San Antonio Iguanas players
St. Louis Vipers players
Victoria Cougars (WHL) players
Waco Wizards players
Wichita Thunder players